Raquel Rojas (May 24, 1987, Mérida) is a Venezuelan actress and entertainer, mostly known internationally for her role as  Rosa Forlán in the successful Nickelodeon Latin American teen soap opera, Grachi and as Inmate Silvia in the horror film, The Exorcism of God. She is also known for different appearances in Telemundo telenovelas.La venezolana Raquel Rojas triunfa en Telemundo Por un anónimo en el 2010. Consultado el 29 de junio de 2011.

Early life 
Raquel Rojas was born in Mérida, Venezuela, when her mother was studying medicine at the Universidad de Los Andes. From childhood, Rojas was interested in performing arts and her first foray into theatre was at the age of 6 at a community theatre in Los Salias, San Antonio de los Altos, in Miranda. She spent a large part of her childhood in this city before moving to Caracas. She continued performing through most of her childhood and adolescence, studying with different acting teachers while at school. She completed two years of a degree in Social Communication at the Andrés Bello Catholic University and then moved to Miami, Florida, where she obtained a Bachelor of Performing Arts and Film from the University of Miami.

Rojas speaks four languages: Spanish, English, Italian, and French. She has been under the tutelage of teachers of the dramatic art that include Noel de La Cruz, Julio César Mármol, and Karl Hoffman, among others. Rojas was mentioned in media as having a "fresh and attractive image.” The newspaper Avance commented that "[she] has become synonymous with beauty and talent in distant lands."

Career 
In 2010, after graduating from university, Rojas had small but well-received roles in the telenovelas Perro Amor, El Fantasma de Elena y Alguien te Mira, all on Telemundo in the United States. In 2011, she got the role of Rosa in the teen telenovela Grachi, for which she became known internationally. It premiered in Latin America on May 2, 2011. Grachi was renewed for two more seasons, airing until 2013.

Filmography

References

External links 
 

1994 births
Andrés Bello Catholic University alumni
People from Mérida, Mérida
University of Miami alumni
Venezuelan emigrants to the United States
Venezuelan television actors
Living people